Pandan may refer to:

Plants
Pandanus, a genus of tropical trees, the screw-pines
Pandanus amaryllifolius, a tropical plant used in Southeast Asian cuisine

Places

Brunei 
 Kampong Pandan, Brunei

Indonesia 
 Tanjung Pandan, Belitung, Indonesia
 Pandan, Central Tapanuli, North Sumatera, Indonesia
 Pandan Kecil, an island in Riau, Indonesia

Malaysia
Pandan-Tebrau, a location in Johor, Malaysia
Pandan, Sarawak
Pandan, Selangor
Pandan (federal constituency), represented in the Dewan Rakyat

Philippines
Pandan, Antique, a municipality in the Philippines
Pandan, Catanduanes, a municipality in the Philippines
Pandan, Angeles, a barangay in Angeles, Philippines
Pandan Islands, two islands part of Sablayan, Occidental Mindoro, Philippines
Pandan Niog, a barangay in Pangutaran, Sulu, Philippines
Pandan, a barangay in Real, Quezon, Philippines
Pandan, a barangay in Caoayan, Ilocos Sur, Philippines
Pandan, a barangay in Cabusao, Camarines Sur, Philippines

Singapore
Pandan Gardens, a housing estate in Jurong East, Singapore
Pandan Reservoir, a reservoir in Singapore
Selat Pandan, a strait south of Singapore's main island
Pandan, a subzone of Clementi planning area

Objects 
 Paan dan, a type of container for storing paan (betel leaf)